= Luni Mawaran =

- Town
- Location within Pakistan
- Coordinates: 33.26°N 73.23°E
- Country: Pakistan
- Province: (Islamabad Capital Territory) Islamabad C.T
- Elevation: 538 m (1,765 ft)

Population
  - Total: 59,620
- Time zone: UTC+5 (PST)

Luni Mawaran is a town in the Islamabad Capital Territory of Pakistan. It is located at 33° 26' 30N 73° 23' 50E with an altitude of 538 metres (1768 feet).
